Frank Williams Durkee (October 5, 1861 – May 21, 1939) was an American football player and coach and a college faculty member. He served as a player-coach at Tufts University in Medford, Massachusetts in 1887, compiling a record of 4–6. He was also a team captain on the school's baseball team in 1888.

Durkee later worked as a chemistry professor at Tufts. He died of a heart attack on May 21, 1939, at his home in Medford.

Head coaching record

References

External links
 

1861 births
1939 deaths
19th-century American chemists
19th-century players of American football
20th-century American chemists
Player-coaches
Tufts Jumbos baseball players
Tufts Jumbos football coaches
Tufts Jumbos football players
Tufts University faculty
People from Tunbridge, Vermont
Players of American football from Vermont